The Palm Beach Hawks were an American ice hockey organization playing in Lake Worth, Florida. They fielded two Tier III teams and a number of youth teams.

History
Established in 2006 as the Palm Beach Predators, the organization was renamed as the Hawks in 2009. The organization were members of the Southeast Junior Hockey League (which became the EJHL South in 2011) from 2006 until 2011. A second team was formed for the 2009–10 season which competed in the Metropolitan Junior Hockey League and then the Empire Junior Hockey League from 2011 to 2013. In 2013, many American junior hockey leagues reorganized and both teams joined the United States Premier Hockey League in the Elite and Empire Divisions, respectively. In 2015, the Empire Division was rebranded to the USP3. In 2017, the USP3 was disbanded, the USPHL added a higher division, and the Hawks' teams were promoted to the Premier and Elite Divisions.

The junior-level Hawks in both the USPHL Premier and Elite were removed from the schedule early into the 2018–19 season.

Season-by-season

References

External links
Palm Beach Jr. Hawks
Palm Beach Hawks Youth Hockey
Palm Beach SkateZone

Ice hockey teams in Florida
2006 establishments in Florida
Ice hockey clubs established in 2006
Lake Worth Beach, Florida
Sports in Palm Beach County, Florida